Strongyloides gulae is a parasitic roundworm infecting the esophagus of the green water snake, as well as eight other species of snakes. It was first described from Louisiana.

References

Further reading
Veazey, Ronald S., T. Bonner Stewart, and Theron G. Snider III. "Ureteritis and nephritis in a Burmese python (Python molurus bivitattus) due to Strongyloides sp. infection." Journal of Zoo and Wildlife Medicine (1994): 119-122.
Dorris, Mark, Mark E. Viney, and Mark L. Blaxter. "Molecular phylogenetic analysis of the genus Strongyloides and related nematodes." International journal for parasitology 32.12 (2002): 1507-1517.
Dos Santos, K. R., et al. "Morphological and molecular characterization of Strongyloides ophidiae (Nematoda, Strongyloididae)." Journal of helminthology84.02 (2010): 136-142.

External links 

Strongylidae
Parasitic nematodes of vertebrates
Parasites of reptiles
Nematodes described in 1966